Julius Hare RCA (23 January 1859 – 12 March 1932) was a British artist, painter of portraits and landscapes.

Born in Dublin, he was the son of Mathias Hare LLD.  He was educated at Loughborough Grammar School in England before Studied under Adolphe Yvon of Paris, and also at the West London School of Art, South Kensington, and the Heatherley School of Fine Art.  He was made an associate of the Royal Academy of Art and exhibited there.

He lived in Plas Mawr, Conwy, North Wales.

References

External links
 Art UK: Day Fades

1859 births
1932 deaths
People educated at Loughborough Grammar School
19th-century British painters
British male painters
20th-century British painters
British landscape painters
British portrait painters
19th-century British male artists
20th-century British male artists